Bulgaria–Vietnam relations are foreign relations between Bulgaria and Vietnam. 
Both countries established diplomatic relation on February 8, 1950.  Bulgaria has an embassy in Hanoi.  Vietnam has an embassy in Sofia.

Cooperation
In 2006, the Bulgarian Government agreed to  a healthcare cooperation plan with Vietnam. The two-year plan includes cooperation in many areas, mainly in public healthcare, inpatient and outpatient help, food security, medical education.

See also 
 Foreign relations of Bulgaria
 Foreign relations of Vietnam
 Vietnam–EU relations

References

External links 
  Bulgarian embassy in Hanoi
  Vietnamese embassy in Sofia
  Vietnamese Ministry of Foreign Affairs about relations with Bulgaria

 
Vietnam
Bilateral relations of Vietnam